Pindaia is a genus of fly in the family Dolichopodidae from the Australasian realm. The genus is named after the New Caledonian place name "Pindai".

Species
 Pindaia bellangrensis Bickel, 2014
 Pindaia dispersia Bickel, 2014
 Pindaia enoggera Bickel, 2014

References

Dolichopodidae genera
Medeterinae
Diptera of Australasia